Anatrachyntis ptilodelta is a moth in the family Cosmopterigidae. It was described by Edward Meyrick in 1922, and is known from China.

References

Moths described in 1922
Anatrachyntis
Moths of Asia